The Mughan Soviet Republic was a short-lived pro-Bolshevik state that existed in present-day southeastern Azerbaijan from March to June 1919. It was founded in opposition to the Azerbaijan Democratic Republic in Baku. It was proclaimed mostly by the ethnic Russian part of the population of the region, and ceased to exist when the army of Azerbaijan Democratic Republic took control over the region.

References

See also
Azerbaijan Democratic Republic
Provisional Military Dictatorship of Mughan
Talysh-Mughan Autonomous Republic

Communism in Azerbaijan
Modern history of Azerbaijan
Early Soviet republics
States and territories disestablished in 1919
States and territories established in 1919
Former socialist republics
History of Talysh
Post–Russian Empire states